The 1958 Dartmouth Indians football team was an American football team that represented Dartmouth College as a member of the Ivy League during the 1958 NCAA University Division football season. 

In their fourth season under head coach Bob Blackman, the Indians won the Ivy League. They compiled a 7–2 record and outscored opponents 182 to 83. Alvin Krutsch was the team captain.

The Indians' 6–1 conference record was the best in the Ivy League. They outscored Ivy opponents 154 to 69. 

Dartmouth played its home games at Memorial Field on the college campus in Hanover, New Hampshire.

Schedule

References

Dartmouth
Dartmouth Big Green football seasons
Ivy League football champion seasons
Dartmouth Indians football